In music, the major Neapolitan scale and the minor Neapolitan scale are two musical scales. Both scales are minor, in that they both contain the note a minor third above the root. The major and minor Neapolitan scales are instead differentiated by the quality of their sixth.

The sequence of scale steps for the Neapolitan minor is as follows:
 1  2  3 4  5  6 7  8
 A  B  C  D  E  F  G A
 [H, W, W, W, H, WH, H
 C  D  E F  G  A B  C]

And for the Neapolitan major:
 1  2  3 4  5  6  7  8
 A  B  C  D  E  F G A
 [H, W, W, W, W, W, H
 C  D  E F  G  A  B  C]

The scales are distinguished from the harmonic and ascending melodic minor scales by the lowered supertonic or second scale degree. This could also be known as the "Phrygian harmonic minor" or "Phrygian melodic minor." The scale therefore shares with the Phrygian mode the property of having a minor second above the tonic.

Both are accompanied well by power or minor chords.

The 4th mode of the Neapolitan major, also known as the Lydian Dominant 6 scale, is an excellent choice for the 911/13 (no 5) chord. Said mode contains all the alterations plus the 5. A whole tone scale is often used but that mode tends to be minus the 5 that the Lydian Minor contains.

The 5th mode of the Neapolitan major is also known as the major Locrian scale.

Modes
The scale contains the following modes:  {| class="wikitable"
|-
! align="center" | Mode
! align="center" | Name of scale
! colspan="8" align="center" | Degrees
! colspan="8" |Notes (on C Neap. Minor)
!Triad Chords
!Seventh Chords
|-
| align="center" | 1
| Neapolitan Minor ||   1 || 2 || 3 || 4 || 5 || 6 || 7 || 8
|C
|D
|E
|F
|G
|A
|B
|C
|Cm
|Cmmaj7
|-
| align="center" | 2
| Lydian 6 ||  1 ||  2 || 3 || 4 || 5 || 6 || 7 || 8
|D
|E
|F
|G
|A
|B
|C
|D
|D
|Dmaj7 or D6 (equivalent to D7)
|-
| align="center" | 3
| Mixolydian Augmented  ||   1 || 2 || 3 || 4 || 5 || 6 || 7 || 8
|E
|F
|G
|A
|B
|C
|D
|E
|E+
|E+7
|-
| align="center" | 4
| Romani Minor 
(or Aeolian/Natural Minor 4)
|   1 ||   2 || 3 || 4 || 5 || 6 || 7 || 8
|F
|G
|A
|B
|C
|D
|E
|F
|Fm
|Fm7
|-
| align="center" | 5
| Locrian Dominant ||   1 || 2 || 3 || 4 || 5 || 6 || 7 || 8
|G
|A
|B
|C
|D
|E
|F
|G
|G♭5
|G7♭5
|-
| align="center" | 6
| Ionian/Major 2 ||   1 ||  2 || 3 || 4 || 5 || 6 || 7 || 8
|A
|B
|C
|D
|E
|F
|G
|A
|A or Am
|Amaj7 or Ammaj7
|-
| align="center" | 7
| Ultralocrian/Altered Diminished 3 ||   1 || 2 || 3|| 4 || 5 || 6 || 7 || 8
|B
|C
|D
|E
|F
|G
|A
|B
|*B♭5
|**B 6♭5
|}

{| class="wikitable"
|-
! align="center" | Mode
! align="center" | Name of scale
! colspan="8" align="center" | Degrees
! colspan="8" |Notes (on C Neap. Major)
!Triad Chords
!Seventh Chords
|-
| align="center" | 1
| Neapolitan Major ||   1 || 2 || 3 || 4 || 5 || 6 || 7 || 8
|C
|D
|E
|F
|G
|A
|B
|C
|Cm
|Cmmaj7
|-
| align="center" | 2
| Leading Whole Tone 
(or Lydian Augmented 6)
|  1 ||  2 || 3 || 4 || 5 || 6 || 7 || 8
|D
|E
|F
|G
|A
|B
|C
|D
|D+
|D+maj7 or D+6 (equivalent to D+7)
|-
| align="center" | 3
| Lydian Augmented Dominant ||   1 || 2 || 3 || 4 || 5 || 6 || 7 || 8
|E
|F
|G
|A
|B
|C
|D
|E
|E+
|E+7
|-
| align="center" | 4
| Lydian Dominant ♭6 ||   1 ||   2 || 3 || 4 || 5 || 6 || 7 || 8
|F
|G
|A
|B
|C
|D
|E
|F
|F
|F7
|-
| align="center" | 5
| Major Locrian ||   1 || 2 || 3 || 4 || 5 || 6 || 7 || 8
|G
|A
|B
|C
|D
|E
|F
|G
|G♭5
|G7♭5
|-
| align="center" | 6
| Half-Diminished 4 
(or Altered Dominant 2)
|   1 ||  2 || 3 || 4 || 5 || 6 || 7 || 8
|A
|B
|C
|D
|E
|F
|G
|A
|Aο or *A♭5
|Aø7 or ***A7♭5
|-
| align="center" | 7
| Altered Dominant 3 ||   1 || 2 || 3|| 4 || 5 || 6 || 7 || 8
|B
|C
|D
|E
|F
|G
|A
|B
|*B♭5
|***B7♭5
|} Notes :
* While this triad consisted of 1, 4 (~3), and 5 notes, this is not really a normal triad since no use of 3rd-grade notes (in B : D or D/E). Instead, this triad more likely shaped as sus4 triad (although 4 is enharmonic to 3).
** 7 enharmonic to 6, so the 6th chords is available instead of 7th (thus being used here).
*** These chords can actually be respelled as 7alt (the 75 is one of the altered dominant chords).

See also
 Neapolitan chord
 Neapolitan school

Sources

Further reading
 Hewitt, Michael. Musical Scales of the World'', . The Note Tree. 2013. .

External links

Heptatonic scales
Musical scales
Tritonic scales
Hemitonic scales